Vietnam participated at the 2019 Southeast Asian Games in Philippines from November 30 to December 11, 2019.

Medal summary

Medal by sports

Medal by dates

Source:

Medallists

References
https://gms.2019seagames.com/RS2019/

External links

2019 in Philippine sport
Nations at the 2019 Southeast Asian Games
2019